A referendum on the Brexit withdrawal agreement, also referred to as a "second referendum", a "rerun", a "people's vote", or a "confirmatory public vote", was proposed by a number of politicians and pressure groups as a way to break the deadlock during the 2017–19 Parliament surrounding the meaningful vote on the Brexit deal.

Following the invocation of Article 50 to begin Brexit negotiations, most proposals for a new referendum suggested a choice between accepting the negotiated withdrawal agreement and remaining in the EU, sometimes with the additional option to leave the EU with no deal. In the case of a three-option referendum, voting systems such as supplementary vote, and Borda count were suggested to allow people to state their second preferences.

Reasons that were cited as justification include campaign finance violations by Vote Leave and Leave.EU, the alleged use of data illicitly harvested by Cambridge Analytica, revelations of Russian interference through fake social media accounts and allegedly through funding, arguments that the "Leave" camp promoted misinformation, a gradual shift in public opinion, fuelled in part by demographic changes such as adolescents who were too young to take part in the first referendum reaching voting age, and that the eventually-arranged terms of Brexit were unknown at the time of the original vote.

The most widely discussed proposal was a referendum between "Remain" and "Accept the deal", which was promoted by the People's Vote pressure group. This was the official position of the Liberal Democrats, the Green Party of England and Wales, Plaid Cymru and the Scottish National Party. The Labour Party also adopted this position in September 2019. The Conservative Party and Brexit Party were opposed to any referendum.

On 12 December 2019, the Conservative Party, led by Boris Johnson, won an 80-seat overall majority in the 2019 general election, ending the possibility of any referendum on the withdrawal agreement being held before ratification by the UK Parliament or before the UK left the European Union. Subsequently, the UK Parliament passed the European Union (Withdrawal Agreement) Act 2020 which received Royal Assent on 23 January 2020, and the United Kingdom formally left the European Union at 23:00 GMT on 31 January 2020.

History
A few weeks after the referendum, an e-petition originally set up beforehand on 25 May 2016 by a member of the Leave-supporting English Democrats demanding it be re-run in the event that a supermajority was not reached became the most popular petition on the site, receiving 4,150,262 signatures. On 5 September 2016, the petition received a non-binding debate by Members of Parliament (MPs) in the Grand Committee Room of Parliament's Westminster Hall but its proposal was rejected.

The Liberal Democrats and Green Party went into the 2017 United Kingdom general election campaigning in favour of a second referendum, and a minority of pro-EU rebels from Labour and the Conservatives also spoke in favour of it. These allied in April 2018 into the People's Vote campaign group. After several cabinet ministers resigned in protest at the Chequers statement setting out the Government's position in the Brexit negotiations, Conservative MP Justine Greening proposed a three-way referendum, using the supplementary vote system in an attempt to avoid vote splitting.

The leader of the Trades Union Congress, which is closely allied with Labour, said at its 2018 conference that it would declare in favour of a second referendum if the government failed to get "the deal that working people need". On 25 September 2018, delegates at the Labour party conference voted in favour of a motion that if Labour did not support Theresa May's deal, and if subsequent attempts to call another general election failed, the party should explore all options, including a second referendum. In early December 2018, the Financial Times reported that Leave groups had also started preparing for another referendum.

The Labour leadership did not make any commitments to a referendum in January 2019. On 18 February 2019, seven pro-EU MPs resigned from the Labour Party to form The Independent Group (TIG). Over the following days, another Labour MP and three Conservative Party MPs joined them. All eleven supported a referendum.

The following week, the Labour Party announced that it would put forward its own second referendum amendment if its attempts to safeguard workers' rights, Single Market access and Customs Union membership failed.

In September 2019, the Labour Party adopted the position of holding a public vote on whether to leave or remain regardless of which party negotiated the withdrawal agreement.

Parliamentary votes
The proposal for a referendum on the withdrawal agreement was first put to Parliament on 14 March 2019 in an amendment (tabled by Sarah Wollaston) to the motion to request the first extension to the Article 50 deadline, where it was rejected by 85–334, with the Labour Party (and all but 43 of its MPs) abstaining.

On 27 March and 1 April 2019, a series of indicative votes was held, both times including a referendum on the withdrawal agreement among the proposals. All proposals failed, with those for such a referendum receiving in the first round 268 Ayes, 295 Noes and 71 abstentions (a majority of 27) and in the second round 280 Ayes, 292 Noes and 62 abstentions (a majority of 12). In both rounds, it was the proposal second-closest to receiving an affirmative majority.

Opinion polling

Polling companies asked questions based on a hypothetical future referendum after the 2016 referendum. For most of 2016 and 2017, public opinion was consistently against another referendum and in the event one was called, polling suggested the Leave option would win again. As Brexit negotiations continued however, the Leave lead consistently slipped and public support for another referendum grew. , no poll in the Britain Elects poll-tracker had shown a lead for Leave since April 2018, and political scientist John Curtice has noted "a modest but discernible softening of the Leave vote".

The results of polls asking whether a further referendum should be held varied depending on how the question was phrased: in general a "second referendum" was less popular than a "public vote" or similar descriptor.

After the scale of Conservative rebellion to the Chequers statement became clear, some polls asked a three-way preference between "Remain", "Deal" and "No deal". The results in this case depended to a great degree on the choice of voting system – a first-past-the-post system for example might see a large Remain win due to vote splitting between the two Leave options.

Support for a future referendum
The following table shows the support for a public vote on the withdrawal agreement or a second EU referendum according to polls conducted after the 2016 referendum.

Advocates

Political parties

 Liberal Democrats
 Green Party of England and Wales
 Scottish Green Party
 Green Party in Northern Ireland
 Peace Party
 Renew Britain
 National Health Action Party
 Radical Party
 Scottish National Party
 Plaid Cymru
 Mebyon Kernow
 Alliance Party of Northern Ireland
 Social Democratic and Labour Party
 Women's Equality Party
 UK European Union Party
 The Independent Group for Change
 Labour Party
 UK EPP
 Left Unity
 Advance Together
 Animal Welfare Party

Members of Parliament

Labour Party

Independent

See also
Proposed second Scottish independence referendum

Notes

References

Proposed referendums
Ref
Proposals in the United Kingdom